Welcome to Secret Time (often stylized as Welcome to SECRET Time) is the second studio album (first Japanese release) by South Korean girl group Secret. The album was released on August 22, 2012, by Sony Music Entertainment Japan.

Background and release

In August 2011, Secret made their official debut in Japan with the release of the Japanese version of their Korean hit, "Madonna". In November 2011, they released their first mini-album in the country with Shy Boy. It was then followed by two original Japanese singles entitled "So Much for Goodbye" and "Twinkle Twinkle". On June 24, 2012 TS Entertainment officials confirmed, "SECRET will be releasing their first album with "Love is Move" as their title track in Japan next month. This will mark the beginning of their official activities." They continued, "The album contains not only "Love is Move", but a number of their Korean hits along with brand new tracks. The girls will be leaving for Japan in the beginning of August and spend a month promoting in both Korea and Japan.”

Welcome to Secret Time was released on August 22, 2012. The Japanese version of "Love is Move", dubbed as "Ai wa Move", serves as the lead single. It also included the group's Korean releases "Madonna" and "Shy Boy," a Japanese version of "Starlight Moonlight," and their Japanese original singles "So Much for Goodbye" and "Twinkle Twinkle."

Singles

"Madonna"
On June 14, 2011, Secret released the Japanese music video of "Madonna" The Japanese version of the song was released in Japan on August 3, 2011, on the CD single, Madonna. The single also included a B-side, "My Boy". On August 10, the group performed the song on the popular Japanese music program, Coming Soon!! The single ranked 9th on Oricon's weekly singles chart of August 10, with sales of 13,124 copies. "Madonna" sold over 20,000 copies in Japan.

"So Much for Goodbye"
 was released as a CD single on February 29, 2012 through Sony Music Associated Records. The CD single contains three tracks namely "So Much for Goodbye",  and "Color of Love". "So Much for Goodbye" was produced by Im Sanghyuk and Jeon Daun, the same composers of "Don't Laugh" from the album Moving in Secret. The Japanese lyrics were written by Junji Ishiwatari. Secret stated through their official Japanese website, "'So Much for Goodbye' is a ballad song accompanied with a beautiful piano, guitar and string instrument arrangement." The group embarked on their first promotional tour in Japan named "Secret 1st Japan Tour", held in March 2012 in support of the single.

The single peaked at number 14 and 17 on Oricon's daily and weekly singles charts respectively, selling 9,656 copies in two weeks. "So Much for Goodbye" also charted at number 55 on Billboard'''s Japan Hot 100.

"Twinkle Twinkle"
"Twinkle Twinkle" was released as a CD single on June 13, 2012 through Sony Music Associated Records. It also includes the B-side track, "First Kiss". An anime version of "Twinkle Twinkle" was used as the ending theme song of the Naruto spin-off, "Naruto SD: Rock Lee and his Ninja Pals" aired on TV Tokyo. Sony Music Japan released the official music video of "Twinkle Twinkle" on May 11.

The single peaked at number 11 and 16 on Oricon's daily and weekly singles charts respectively, selling 8,022 copies in four weeks. "Twinkle Twinkle" also charted at number 63 on the Japan Hot 100. Rolling Stone Japan rated the single two out of five stars.

"Love Is Move"
The Japanese version of "Love Is Move" is the album's lead single. "Love Is Move" is an uptempo song, composed in a contemporary pop style. The song is also retro-inspired, with influences from 1930s swing music. The song's concept was inspired by the 1930s cartoon character Betty Boop. Kang Ji Won and Kim Ki Bum both produced and wrote the song's lyrics and melody, while Kang Ji Won arranged the track.

Track listing
The album was released in 3 different versions: Limited Edition A (CD+DVD), Limited Edition B (CD+DVD), and Regular Edition (CD-Only). The DVD for Limited Edition A features the Zepp Tokyo performance of the girls' first Japan tour, 1st Japan Tour Secret Time 2012. Meanwhile, Limited Edition B comes with a DVD containing 5 music videos and their making-of footage.

Standard Edition

Limited Edition A
Limited Edition A contains the Standard Edition CD and the DVD contains the Zepp Tokyo performance of the girls’ first Japan tour, Secret 1st Japan Tour (16 tracks).

Limited Edition B
Limited Edition B contains the Standard Edition CD and the DVD contains 5 music videos and their making-of footage. Music Videos for "Madonna," "Shy Boy," "So Much For Goodbye," "Twinkle Twinkle" and album's title track "Love Is Move" + making of "Love Is Move".

Charts
Oricon

Other Charts

 Credits and personnel 
These credits were adapted from the Welcome to Secret Time'' liner notes.

Kim Tae-sung – executive producer co-producing
Song Jieun - vocals
Han Sunhwa - vocals
Jun Hyoseong - vocals
Jung Hana - vocals

Release history

References

2012 albums
Japanese-language albums
Secret (South Korean band) albums
TS Entertainment albums